Hojjatoleslam Mohammad Hassan Ghadrdan Gharamaleki (born 1965) is an Iranian philosopher and professor of Kalam at the Research Institute for Islamic Culture and Thought. His books titled God and the Problem of Evil and Koran and Pluralism won the Howzeh Book of the Year Award.

Works
 Secularism in Christianity and Islam
 God and the Problem of Evil 
 Koran and Pluralism
 Koran and Secularlism
 Politics and Government
 Philosophical Kalam

References

Iranian Shia scholars of Islam
Academic staff of the Research Institute for Islamic Culture and Thought
Religion academics
Living people
Iranian political scientists
20th-century Iranian philosophers
1965 births
21st-century Iranian philosophers